Abu Bakr “A.B.” Shawky is an Egyptian-Austrian writer and director. His first feature film, Yomeddine, was selected to participate in the 2018 Cannes Film Festival and was screened in the Main Competition section and compete for the Palme d'Or.

Personal life
Shawky is husband to Dina Emam. The two got married after the production of their movie, Yomeddine.

References

Egyptian film directors
Austrian film directors
Living people
Year of birth missing (living people)